The Fall of the Stone City is a 2008 novel by the Albanian writer Ismail Kadare. Apart from winning the Rexhai Surroi Prize for the best book of the year, in Kosovo the novel was also shortlisted for the Independent Foreign Fiction Prize in 2013.

Background 
Kadare had previously written about his home city Gjirokastër in his earlier novels Chronicle in Stone and A Question of Lunacy.

Plot

Reception 
Characterizing it as "a masterful recuperation" from Kadare's previous novel, The Accident, Peter Carty from The Independent went on to describe it as "an outstanding feat of imagination delivered in inimitable style, alternating between the darkly elusive and the menacingly playful.".

See also
Albanian literature

References

2008 novels
21st-century Albanian novels
Novels by Ismail Kadare
Novels set in Albania
Onufri Publishing House books